The Honda Sports Award is an annual award in the United States, given to the best collegiate female athlete in each of twelve sports. There are four nominees for each sport, and the twelve winners of the Honda Sports Award are automatically in the running for the Honda-Broderick Cup award, as the Collegiate Woman Athlete of the Year. Three other athletes are honored as the Division II Athlete of the Year, Division III Athlete of the Year, and Inspiration Award winner.

Process
Winners are selected in each of the 12 NCAA-sanctioned sports by a panel of more than 1,000 NCAA administrators. Three other athletes are honored as the Division II Athlete of the Year, Division III Athlete of the Year, and Inspiration Award winner. Each woman is selected not only for her superior athletic skills, but also for her leadership abilities, academic excellence and eagerness to participate in community service.

At the end of the year, one deserving athlete will be chosen as the Collegiate Woman Athlete of the Year and receive the coveted Honda-Broderick Cup. Past winners of this prestigious award include Jackie Joyner and Mia Hamm.

Honda has donated more than $3.4 million in grants and scholarships to the universities over the course of the program.

History of the awards
The Awards were first created in 1976, when Tom Broderick, an owner of an apparel store in Fergus, Ontario, decided to partner with Judie Holland, the senior women's administrator at UCLA and Irv Grossman, a journalist, sports marketer and media consultant, to create awards to recognize top female athletes at the collegiate level.

The first awards were given in 1977, for Division I athletes, initially in ten sports and later expanded to 12 sports:

 Basketball
 Cross Country
 Field Hockey
 Golf
 Gymnastics
 Softball
 Swimming & Diving
 Tennis
 Track & Field
 Volleyball
 Soccer (added in 1990)
 Lacrosse (added in 2001)

Each of these awards was initially called the Broderick Award. In addition to an individual award for a recipient in each of the ten sports, an overall winner across all sports was selected, and that individual also received an award, called the Broderick Cup, representing the top female athlete in collegiate athletics.

Although athletics prowess was a major consideration in the selection process, the selection committee considered "not only athletic achievement but also the ideals of team contribution, scholastic endeavor, school and community involvement and those personal characteristics as stated in the philosophy of the NCAA".

In 1985, American Honda agreed to become the main sponsor of the awards, so the name of the award was changed to the Honda-Broderick Award for each of the individual sports, and the Honda-Broderick Cup for the overall winner.

In 1988, three new awards were created. Two awards recognize Division II and Division III athletes, respectively with a single award for each division covering all athletes in all of the designated sports. The third award is the Inspiration Award, which goes to a female athlete who has had to overcome hardship. Nominees are provided by all NCAA sanctioned schools and the organization Board of Directors makes the final selection.

Between 1995 and 2008 the organization also selected a recipient of an Award of Merit. The potential recipients were not collegiate athletes, but individuals and organization who contributed significantly to:

 Public awareness and appreciation of women’s collegiate athletics
 Elevation of the status of women’s collegiate sports on a national level

This award was renamed the Irv Grossman Award of Merit in 2007, after his passing in 2006.

The recipients of this award have been:

 1995 Charlotte West (Southern Illinois)
 1996 Phyllis Howlett (Big Ten Conference)
 1997 Christine Grant (Iowa)
 1998 Judith M. Sweet (UC San Diego)
 1999 Judith R. Holland (UCLA)
 2000 Barbara Hedges (Washington)
 2002 Ruth Berkey (NCAA)
 2003 Patsy Mink (Senator, Hawaii)
 2004 Birch Bayh (Senator, Indiana)
 2007 Vivian Stringer (Head Coach, Rutgers Women's Basketball)
 2007 Rutgers Women's Basketball (Women's Basketball Team)
 2008 Women's Sports Foundation (WSF, Founded by Billie Jean King)

Award ceremony 
Honda Sports Award announcement for the winners of the twelve sports are scheduled throughout the school year, following the completion of the post-season tournament. Other awards are presented as part of a two day event, typically in late June of each year.

The Collegiate Women Sports Award (CWSA) partnered with ESPNU for the 2013 event, and since 2014, have partnered with CBS to televise the announcement of the following awards:

 Honda Inspiration Award
 Honda Division II Player of the Year
 Honda Division III Player of the Year
 "Top Three" finalists selected from the twelve award winners of each individual sport 
 Honda Cup for the overall Collegiate Woman of the Year

Since 2013, the annual event has been held at the USC Founders Club at Galen Center in Los Angeles.

The 2020 award ceremony scheduled for June has been cancelled due to Covid-19.

Pre-2000 Winners and nominees 
For award winners and nominees prior to 2000, see Honda Sports Award pre 2000 winners and nominees

2000–01 Winners and nominees 
Sources:

Sources:

2001–02 Winners and nominees 
Sources:

Sources:

2002–03 Winners and nominees 
Sources:

Sources:

2003–04 Winners and nominees 
Sources:

Sources:

2004–05 Winners and nominees 
Sources:

Sources:

2005–06 Winners and nominees 
Sources:

Sources:

2006–07 Winners and nominees 
Sources:

Sources:

2007–08 Winners and nominees 
Sources:

Sources:

2008–09 Winners and nominees
Sources:

Sources:

2009–10 Winners and nominees
Sources:

Sources:

2010–11 Winners and nominees
Sources:

Sources:

2011–12 Winners and nominees 
Sources:

Sources:

2012–13 Winners and nominees
Sources:

Sources:

2013–14 Winners and nominees
Sources:

Sources:

2014–15 Winners and nominees
Sources:

Sources:

2015–16 Winners and nominees
Source:

Sources:

2016–17 Winners and nominees 
Sources:

Sources:

2017–18 Winners and nominees
Sources:

Sources:

2018–19 Winners and nominees 
Sources:

Sources:

2019–20 Winners and nominees 
Sources:

Due to COVID-19 issues, sports seasons were affected. The four fall sports (cross country, field hockey, soccer and volleyball) were able to conclude both their regular season and championships. The three winter sports (swimming & diving, basketball and gymnastics) were able to complete their regular seasons, but championships were canceled. The five spring sports (tennis, golf, lacrosse, softball and  track & field) were unable to hold their regular season or championships.

The NCAA decisions about cancellations affected the Collegiate Women Sports Awards process.

Each of the fall sports could proceed as usual. The winter sports had a regular season without championships, but the organization concluded it could select nominees and winners based upon regular season results.  However, with no regular season or championships for the spring sports, the organization was forced to conclude that no awards could be issued for those five sports.

The winners of each of the twelve sports are considered for both the Top Three award and the overall Honda Cup—but because not all sports are represented, the decision was made not to do selections for the Top Three or overall Honda Cup. In addition, the DII and DIII award is across all sports. While nominees in some sports were selected, not all sports are represented, so there will be no DII or DIII award winner for this year. The Inspiration Award will continue as usual.

Sources:

2020–21 winners and nominees 
COVID-19 continued to affect college sports seasons in 2020–21. Of the three NCAA divisions, the only one that held championships in any fall sport (cross country, field hockey, soccer, volleyball) was Division I, and even then all of those championship events were held in spring 2021 instead of fall 2020. Divisions II and III held no championships in any fall sport. Of the three winter sports covered by the Honda Award program, the only one whose regular season and championship was held as scheduled was gymnastics, a sport with a single championship open to members of all NCAA divisions. In both basketball and swimming & diving, Divisions I and II held their regular seasons and championship events (although D-II had a reduced field), but most D-III members opted out of winter sports entirely, leading to that division's championships being canceled. Only the five spring sports (tennis, golf, lacrosse, softball, track & field) were largely unaffected, with all divisions holding regular seasons and championships in each sport.

Because of continued disruptions in D-II and D-III, the presenters concluded that no athlete of the year awards would be presented in those divisions.

Sources:

2021–22 winners and nominees

See also
Honda-Broderick Cup
National Collegiate Athletic Association#Individual awards
Honda Sports Award (basketball)
 List of sports awards honoring women

References

External links
Honda Award official website

College sports trophies and awards in the United States
Sports awards honoring women
Women's sports in the United States
Honda
Sportsmanship trophies and awards
Awards established in 1976